Alibek Muratovich Kachmazov (born 17 August 2002) is a Russian tennis player.

Kachmazov has a career high ATP singles ranking of 319 achieved on 29 August 2022. He also has a career high ATP doubles ranking of 287 achieved on 29 August 2022.

Kachmazov made his ATP main draw debut at the 2019 Kremlin Cup after receiving a wildcard for the singles main draw.

Challenger and World Tennis Tour Finals

Singles: 9 (6–3)

Doubles: 3 (2–1)

References

External links

2002 births
Living people
Russian male tennis players
Sportspeople from Vladikavkaz